This is a list of episodes of the 2008 Japanese television series Kamen Rider Kiva. Each episode title combines a word or phrase relating to music and a phrase more directly related to the episode. A symbol from musical notation is used to separate these two halves of the episodes' titles (an exception is the finale, which uses the music end barline at the end of the title).

Episodes 

{| class="wikitable" width="98%"
|-style="border-bottom:8px solid #FF5F5F"
! width="4%" | Act # !! Title !! Writer !! Original airdate 
|-|colspan="4" bgcolor="#e6e9ff"|

 Fate: Wake Up! 

|-|colspan="4" bgcolor="#e6e9ff"|

 Suite: Father/Son Violin 

|-|colspan="4" bgcolor="#e6e9ff"|

 Heroic: Perfect Hunter 

|-|colspan="4" bgcolor="#e6e9ff"|

 Reverie: Wild Blue 

|-|colspan="4" bgcolor="#e6e9ff"|

 Duet: Stalker Panic 

|-|colspan="4" bgcolor="#e6e9ff"|

 Replay: Humans Are All Music 

|-|colspan="4" bgcolor="#e6e9ff"|

 Hymn: Three Star Full Course of Darkness 

|-|colspan="4" bgcolor="#e6e9ff"|

 Soul: The Angered Dragon Castle 

|-|colspan="4" bgcolor="#e6e9ff"|

 Symphony: Ixa, Fist On 

|-|colspan="4" bgcolor="#e6e9ff"|

 Sabre Dance: Glasy Melody 

|-|colspan="4" bgcolor="#e6e9ff"|

 Rolling Stone: Door of Dreams 

|-|colspan="4" bgcolor="#e6e9ff"|

 First Live: Golden Speed 

|-|colspan="4" bgcolor="#e6e9ff"|

 Unfinished: Daddy Fight 

|-|colspan="4" bgcolor="#e6e9ff"|

 Pomp and Circumstance: Thunderstrike Purple Eye 

|-|colspan="4" bgcolor="#e6e9ff"|

 Resurrection: Checkmate Four 

|-|colspan="4" bgcolor="#e6e9ff"|

 Player: The Rules of Cruelty 

|-|colspan="4" bgcolor="#e6e9ff"|

 Lesson: My Way 

|-|colspan="4" bgcolor="#e6e9ff"|

 Quartet: Listen to Your Heart's Voice 

|-|colspan="4" bgcolor="#e6e9ff"|

 Fusion: Aura Storm 

|-|colspan="4" bgcolor="#e6e9ff"|

 Nocturne: The Lovely Messiah 

|-|colspan="4" bgcolor="#e6e9ff"|

 Rhapsody: The Fate of the Ring 

|-|colspan="4" bgcolor="#e6e9ff"|

 Overture: Fateful Intersection 

|-|colspan="4" bgcolor="#e6e9ff"|

 Variation: Fugitives Forever 

|-|colspan="4" bgcolor="#e6e9ff"|

 Emperor: Golden Fever 

|-|colspan="4" bgcolor="#e6e9ff"|

 Fanfare: The Queen's Awakening 

|-|colspan="4" bgcolor="#e6e9ff"|

 Metronome: Miraculous Memory 

|-|colspan="4" bgcolor="#e6e9ff"|

 80's: Angry Rising Blue 

|-|colspan="4" bgcolor="#e6e9ff"|

 Request: Time-Altering Battle 

|-|colspan="4" bgcolor="#e6e9ff"|

 When the Saints Go Marching In: I Am King 

|-|colspan="4" bgcolor="#e6e9ff"|

 Curtain Raising: Kiva's Identity 

|-|colspan="4" bgcolor="#e6e9ff"|

 Applause: Motherly Dedicated Transformation 

|-|colspan="4" bgcolor="#e6e9ff"|

 New World: Another Kiva 

|-|colspan="4" bgcolor="#e6e9ff"|

 Supersonic: Saga's Fight 

|-|colspan="4" bgcolor="#e6e9ff"|

 Noise: Melody of Destruction 

|-|colspan="4" bgcolor="#e6e9ff"|

 New Arrangement: Flying Rose 

|-|colspan="4" bgcolor="#e6e9ff"|

 Revolution: Sword Legend 

|-|colspan="4" bgcolor="#e6e9ff"|

 Triangle: Behead the King 

|-|colspan="4" bgcolor="#e6e9ff"|

 Erlking: Mother and Child Reunion 

|-|colspan="4" bgcolor="#e6e9ff"|

 Shout: Targeted Brother 

|-|colspan="4" bgcolor="#e6e9ff"|

 Encore: Nago Ixa Explosively Returns 

|-|colspan="4" bgcolor="#e6e9ff"|

 Lullaby: Release the Heart 

|-|colspan="4" bgcolor="#e6e9ff"|

 The Power of Love: The King's Anger 

|-|colspan="4" bgcolor="#e6e9ff"|

 Wedding March: Time of Parting 

|-|colspan="4" bgcolor="#e6e9ff"|

 Punk: Back to Father 

|-|colspan="4" bgcolor="#e6e9ff"|

 With You: Final Transformation 

|-|colspan="4" bgcolor="#e6e9ff"|

 Full Stop: Farewell, Otoya 

|-|colspan="4" bgcolor="#e6e9ff"|

 Break the Chain: Obey Me! 

|-|colspan="4" bgcolor="#e6e9ff"|

 Finale: The Inheritors of Kiva 

|}

References 

Kiva